Hélder Lopes (born 7 August 1977) is a Portuguese former professional tennis player who competed in the ITF Men's Circuit. He achieved his highest singles ranking of 455 in the world by the Association of Tennis Professionals (ATP) in August 2003. Though he played almost his entire career in the minor circuits, Lopes did play singles and doubles events at the Estoril Open between 2000 and 2003. He also entered five Davis Cup ties in 2002 and 2003.

Career finals

ITF Men's Circuit

Singles: 4 (1 title, 3 runner-ups)

Doubles: 8 (4 titles, 4 runner-ups)

Head-to-head vs. Top 20 players
This section contains Lopes' win-loss record against players who have been ranked 20th or higher in the world rankings during their careers.

National participation

Davis Cup (2 wins, 4 losses)
Lopes played 6 matches in 5 ties for the Portugal Davis Cup team in 2002 and 2003. His singles record was 2–3 and his doubles record was 0–1 (2–4 overall).

   indicates the result of the Davis Cup match followed by the score, date, place of event, the zonal classification and its phase, and the court surface.

References

External links 
 
 
 

1977 births
Living people
Portuguese male tennis players
Sportspeople from Vila Nova de Gaia
21st-century Portuguese people